Idarat al-Mabahith al-Fiqhiya is a research center operating under Jamiat Ulema-e-Hind. Its establishment in 1970 aimed to address modern issues while reaching a Shariah judgment in line with the principles and rules established by the Imams. This collective approach is facilitated by the cooperation and mutual consultation of jurists and scholars. The center has organized multiple Fiqhi seminars, where reliable scholars are invited to respond to question papers regarding modern issues. Answers are then summarized and discussed in a national seminar. A committee of Ulama is appointed to formulate appropriate decisions for the topic under discussion, and objections and observations are raised before final decisions are issued.

Idarat al-Mabahith al-Fiqhiya has played a significant role in solving contemporary problems and demonstrating the Shariah rulings concerning them. The decisions taken by the center are based on the collective diligence and legal insight of scholars, taking into account the purports of the Shariah and emerging needs of the time.

Background 
The origins of Idarat al-Mabahith al-Fiqhiya can be traced back to the need to address new issues and challenges that arose with the scientific explosion and rapid developments in various fields such as sociology, economy, medicine, politics, and trade. With the classification of knowledge into different disciplines and branches, it became increasingly difficult for a single individual to excel in all the necessary disciplines required for deducing rulings from religious sources. As a result, a method of collective thinking was adopted to discuss these issues and arrive at a Shariah judgment in accordance with established principles and rules of Islamic law. This was achieved through the mutual consultation and cooperation of jurists and scholars.

In 1970, Muhammad Miyan Deobandi established Idarat al-Mabahith al-Fiqhiya under the Jamiat Ulama-i-Hind to fulfill this need. Initially, he served as the director of this center. He would draft solutions for various Fiqh problems that arose, and send them to the Ulama for review before publishing his results in Al Jamiat. Through this process, he successfully resolved several significant issues, including the development of regulations for the Moon Sighting Committee based on Hanafi Fiqh. The institution comprised a distinguished group of Islamic scholars and jurists who were well-versed in Hadith, Fiqh, and other disciplines of Islamic sciences. However, after his death, the institution's activities came to a standstill. In 1990, Jamiat president Asad Madani made the decision to revive the center. Since then, the institute has organized 15 national seminars until 2019.

Objectives 
The Idarat has multiple objectives, including finding solutions for economic problems and recent developments in accordance with Islamic frameworks, issuing collective Fatwas to solve problems for Muslims in India, bridging gaps between scholars, conducting collective research to find solutions to modern developments and issues, promoting contemporary scholars views, encouraging talented youth, and organizing seminars and meetings to discuss Fiqhi issues.

Approach 
The Idarat al-Mabaith al-Fiqhiya follows a clear and strong method in dealing with modern issues. They consult Ulama to assist in selecting new topics, arrange detailed questions, and prepare a list of Islamic scholars and experts. Research papers are collected and presented at seminars where participants present their views. A committee of Ulama formulates appropriate resolutions, which are discussed and objections are raised in the final session. The final decisions are published and sent to members and announced in newspapers, magazines, and journals. While the decisions are not considered binding, they are supported by the majority of Ulama.

Seminars 
Below is an overview of the seminars and topics organized by Idarat al-Mabahith al-Fiqhiya:

See also 

 List of Deobandi organisations

References 

Deobandi fiqh
Jamiat Ulama-e-Hind
Research institutes